LOLC Holdings PLC is a Sri Lankan conglomerate listed on the Colombo Stock Exchange (CSE). Originally starting as a non-banking financial company LOLC has grown into one of the largest Sri Lankan conglomerates involved in many sectors and subsidiaries in several countries although it is still mainly involved in the financial sector.

History
LOLC was originally founded as Lanka ORIX Leasing Company (LOLC) which then grew into the LOLC Group. As diversification and growth continued LOLC became a holding company.

By 2019/20 LOLC was among the most profitable companies in Sri Lanka but adopted a strategy of aggressive expansion without paying dividends to fuel overseas expansion in Cambodia, Myanmar, Pakistan, Philippines, Indonesia, Nigeria and Zambia.

In January 2021 the market capitalization of LOLC Holdings exceeded $1Billion.

LOLC using its Browns Investments PLC also became the partner of China Harbour Engineering Company Limited for the development of the Colombo International Financial Center Mixed Development Project. Becoming the first major local investor in the megaproject.

Subsidiaries
LOLC Holdings includes numerous subsidiaries in various sectors and companies with significant ownership by LOLC. These include,

Financial
 LOLC Finance
 LOLC Development Finance
 LOLC Securities
 LOLC Life Assurance
 LOLC General Insurance
 LOLC Factors
 LOLC Securities
 LOLC Capital One
 LOLC Investments
 LOLC Motors
 Commercial Leasing and Finance
 PRASAC Micro Finance Institution
 LOLC Cambodia
 LOLC Myanmar Micro-finance
 LOLC Al-Falaah
 LOLC Fleet Management
 Sarana Sumut Ventura
 LOLC Finance Zambia
 Fina Trust Microfinance Bank
 Pak Oman Microfinance Bank Ltd

Agriculture
 Browns Agriculture
 AgStar 
 Maturata Plantations
 Gal Oya Plantations

Leisure
 Browns Hotels and Resorts
 Excel Restaurants Pvt Ltd

Energy
 Sagasolar Power 
 Sunbird Bioenergy Sierra Leone

Construction
 Browns Engineering and Construction
 Sierra Construction

Information Technology
 LOLC Technologies

Manufacturing
 LOLC Advanced Technologies
 Ceylon Graphene Technologies

References

Conglomerate companies of Sri Lanka
Hospitality companies of Sri Lanka
Companies listed on the Colombo Stock Exchange